Patrick Joseph Keary (10 October 1901 – 20 February 1974) was an Australian rules footballer who played with Hawthorn in the Victorian Football League (VFL).

Family
The son of Patrick Joseph Ambrose Keary (1886–1931), and Mary Ellen Bridget Keary (1885–1966), née Webb, Patrick Joseph Keary was born at Richmond on 10 October 1901.

Football
Recruited from Hawthorn Juniors, Keary played in each of Hawthorn's first six seasons in the VFL. He scored one goal in his VFL career, registered in the final round of the 1927 season in a loss against Richmond.

After his VFL playing career, Keary managed the Hawthorn reserves for over 20 years and in recognition of his service the club named its reserves best and fairest award the Blue Keary trophy.

Death
Keary died at Fitzroy in February 1974 and is buried at Boroondara General Cemetery.

Honours and achievements
Individual
 Hawthorn life member

References

External links 

1901 births
1974 deaths
Australian rules footballers from Victoria (Australia)
Hawthorn Football Club players